Andre Agassi was the defending champion but did not compete that year.

Wayne Ferreira won in the final 6–3, 4–6, 7–5 against Lleyton Hewitt.

Seeds

  Lleyton Hewitt (final)
  Sébastien Grosjean (quarterfinals)
  Sjeng Schalken (second round)
  Gustavo Kuerten (quarterfinals)
  Mark Philippoussis (semifinals)
  Marat Safin (first round)
  Wayne Ferreira (champion)
  Vince Spadea (quarterfinals)

Draw

Finals

Top half

Bottom half

External links
 2003 Mercedes-Benz Cup draw

Los Angeles Open (tennis)
2003 ATP Tour